Antonio Trivulzio (died 1519) was a Roman Catholic prelate who served as Bishop of Como (1518–1519), Bishop of Piacenza (1508–1509), Bishop of Asti (1499–1508 and 1509–1518).

Biography
On 26 Jul 1499, he was appointed during the papacy of Pope Alexander VI as Bishop of Asti.
On 31 Jul 1508, he was transferred by Pope Julius II to the Diocese of Piacenza.
On 9 Jan 1509, he was transferred by Pope Julius II again to the Diocese of Asti.
On 8 Jan 1518, he was transferred by Pope Leo X as Diocese of Como.
He served as Bishop of Como until his death in 1519.

References

External links and additional sources
 (for Chronology of Bishops) 
 (for Chronology of Bishops) 
 (for Chronology of Bishops) 
 (for Chronology of Bishops) 
 (for Chronology of Bishops) 
 (for Chronology of Bishops) 

16th-century Italian Roman Catholic bishops
Bishops appointed by Pope Alexander VI
Bishops appointed by Pope Julius II
Bishops appointed by Pope Leo X
1519 deaths